Mount Thompson may refer to:

Mount Thompson (Antarctica)
Mount Thompson (Alberta), in the Canadian Rockies
Mount Thompson (California), in the Sierra Nevada range
Mount Thompson (Montana) in the Lewis Range, Glacier National Park, United States
Mount Thompson (Queensland) in Australia
Mount Thompson crematorium, in Brisbane, Queensland, Australia
Mount Thomson, in Washington state, previously spelled Thompson
Mount Tommy Thompson, North Cascades, Washington